In Croatia, the standard time is Central European Time (CET; UTC+01:00). Daylight saving time is observed from the last Sunday in March (02:00 CET) to the last Sunday in October (03:00 CEST).

Time notation 

In formal and written language, the time of day is usually expressed using the 24-hour clock. Hours and minutes are separated using either a colon or a full stop. Leading zeroes should only be used for minutes, except in tables, on electronic displays etc. In informal use, especially in speech, the 12-hour clock is used. However, instead of the English "a.m."/"p.m." system, descriptive phrases are used in cases of ambiguity, e.g. ujutro "in the morning", prijepodne "before noon", poslijepodne "afternoon", navečer "in the evening".

IANA time zone database 
In the IANA time zone database, Croatia is given the zone Europe/Zagreb.

See also 
Time in Europe
List of time zones by country
List of time zones by UTC offset

References

External links 
Current time in Croatia at Time.is